Attorney General Grigsby may refer to:

George Barnes Grigsby (1874–1962), Attorney General of Alaska
Melvin Grigsby (1845–1917), Attorney General of South Dakota